Winston Anthony Lloyd Cozier (10 July 1940 – 11 May 2016) was a Barbadian cricket journalist, writer, and radio commentator on West Indian cricket for over fifty years. Scyld Berry wrote that he was both the voice and the conscience of West Indian cricket, the latter because of his harsh criticism of the West Indian board for "squandering the money and legacy that it had inherited".

Early life
Cozier was born in Bridgetown, Barbados, the son of Barbadian journalist Jimmy Cozier, who was the managing editor for the St Lucia Voice and founder of the Barbados Daily News. Cozier's family descended from  Scottish labourers who had emigrated in the 18th century to Barbados. Cozier studied journalism at Carleton University, Ottawa, and began his reporting career in 1958.

He played hockey as a goalkeeper for Barbados and cricket as a batsman and wicket-keeper for local cricket clubs Wanderers and Carlton.

Journalism
He became the editor of the Barbados Daily News in 1961, where he worked with retired cricketer Everton Weekes, and covered the West Indies tour to England in 1963. He was subsequently the cricket correspondent of the Barbados Advocate, and in 1973 he helped to set up The Daily Nation newspaper. He also wrote for the British newspaper The Independent.

Commentating career
His first Test Match commentary on radio was on West Indies v Australia in 1965. He was a member of the BBC's Test Match Special commentary team from 1966, and also commentated on television for Channel Nine in Australia and Sky Sports. During his commentating career, Cozier covered every Wisden Trophy series except one. Despite health problems, he commentated on the 2014/15 England tour of the West Indies. According to Vic Marks, "Tony described the action succinctly and with an objectivity that is beyond many modern broadcasters."

Cozier was known for his knowledge of statistics; during a Marylebone Cricket Club tour in 1967, Brian Johnston played a practical joke on him by pretending that they were on air and asking him to recite the exact bowling figures and birthdays of the entire West Indies team, which he was naturally unable to do. Cozier was specifically requested by Kerry Packer to be one of the commentators for the World Series Cricket; Cozier believed that the general public supported the series, and during a commentary stint in the series, he sang "Blue Moon". In 1994, Cozier wrote of Brian Lara's record-breaking innings that "there was no real surprise among his countrymen, simply the feeling that his inevitable date with destiny had arrived rather more suddenly than expected." Possibly his most famous line was in 1999, after West Indies were bowled out for 51 by Australia at the Queen's Park Oval, he remarked "Where does West Indies cricket go from ’ere?". In 2007, Cozier used a lunch break in a Test match at the Riverside Ground to read a spoof email asking about cricket in Mexico; fellow commentator Jonathan Agnew had to explain the joke to him. He once remarked: "The Queen's Park Oval, exactly as its name suggests—absolutely round."

The parties that he hosted for his media colleagues, held at his small wooden holiday home on the east coast of the island whenever there was a Test match in Barbados, were described by Vic Marks as "legendary". They featured rum punch, a barbecue and beach cricket.

Writing
Cozier wrote the definitive The West Indies: 50 Years of Test Cricket, with a foreword by Garfield Sobers (1978). He was editor of The West Indies Cricket Annual for all its 22 editions. He edited the Wisden History of the World Cup and collaborated with Clive Lloyd and Michael Holding on their respective autobiographies, Living for Cricket and Whispering Death: The Life and Times of Michael Holding.

Honours
As a tribute to his contributions to cricket, the press box at the Kensington Oval was named after him. Test Match Special producer Peter Baxter joked with Cozier that the press box was actually named after another Cozier, since both his father and son were journalists. In December 2011, he was awarded honorary life membership of the MCC for his contribution to cricket.

Death
Cozier died from cancer on 11 May 2016 in Bridgetown, at the age of 75. Fellow cricket correspondent Jonathan Agnew said: "Tony was the master of going between TV and radio ball-by-ball commentary. He was the master of both". The West Indies Cricket Board said: "He represented West Indies wherever he went. He educated people around the world about our cricket, our people, our culture and who we are. His voice was strong and echoed around the cricket world."

He was survived by  his wife of more than fifty years, Jillian,  a son and daughter.

References

External links
 West Indies in India Nov 1974/Jan 1975 – Summary ESPNcricinfo – Excerpt from Cozier's book, The West Indies: Fifty years of Test Cricket (1978). 
 Tony Cozier Unplugged CaribbeanCricket.com, 20 April 2004 – Two-part interview with Cozier
 West Indies cricket needs Legends' clout Tony Cozier's last column for ESPNcricinfo published on 1 May 2016.
 

1940 births
2016 deaths
People from Bridgetown
Barbadian journalists
Barbadian radio presenters
Barbadian radio journalists
West Indian cricket commentators
Cricket historians and writers
Male journalists
The Independent people
People educated at The Lodge School, Barbados
Carleton University alumni
Barbadian people of Scottish descent